The Jesse R. Siler House is a historic house at 115 West Main Street in Franklin, North Carolina.  It is prominently sited at the base of the hill on which most of the city is located.  A two-story log structure was built on this site c. 1819, and expanded between 1820 and 1830 by Jesse Siler, a prominent early settler of the area.  It was modified significantly over the 19th century, most notably receiving a prominent Greek Revival tetrastyle portico.  It retains many interior features from Siler's period of modification, exhibiting transitional Georgian-Federal styling in its mantels.

The house was listed on the National Register of Historic Places in 1982.

See also
National Register of Historic Places listings in Macon County, North Carolina

References

Houses on the National Register of Historic Places in North Carolina
Georgian architecture in North Carolina
Federal architecture in North Carolina
Houses completed in 1820
Houses in Macon County, North Carolina
National Register of Historic Places in Macon County, North Carolina